Robert Pollack or Pollock may refer to:
Robert Pollack (biologist), American biologist
Rocky Pollack, Manitoba judge
Robert Pollock (actor) (born 1960), New Zealand actor
Robert L. Pollock, business writer for The Wall Street Journal
Robert M. Pollock (1856–1920), Republican member of the North Dakota House of Representatives
Robert Mason Pollock (1926–2012), American television writer
Robert A. Pollock (1930–2003), footballer turned writer-novelist who wrote the novel Loophole
Robert Pollok (1798–1827), Scottish poet best known for The Course of Time
Robert Pollok (British Army officer) (1884–1979), Irish-born British Army officer

See also
 Pollock (surname)
 Pollack (surname)
 Pollok (disambiguation)
 Robert (disambiguation)